Enrique Ángel Allyón Padilla (born 29 November 1952) is a former Peruvian cyclist. He competed in the individual road race at the 1972 Summer Olympics.

References

External links
 

1952 births
Living people
Peruvian male cyclists
Olympic cyclists of Peru
Cyclists at the 1972 Summer Olympics
20th-century Peruvian people